Kvemo Ermani or Kvemo-Yermani is a village in the Java District of South Ossetia or Shida Kartli, Georgia, at an altitude of 1,940 m. Distance to the municipality center Java is 46 km.

References 

Populated places in Dzau District